Nilambur is a major town, a municipality and a Taluk in the Malappuram district of the Indian state of Kerala. It is located close to the Nilgiris range of the Western Ghats on the banks of the Chaliyar River. This place is also known as 'Teak Town' because of the abundance of Nilambur teaks in this area; Which is a variety of a large, deciduous tree that occurs in mixed hardwood forests. Unlike many Municipalities of India; Nilambur is covered with large amounts of vegetation making it close to nature and hence make it very scenic and inspiring. 

In the British records, Nilambur and its surroundings are collectively described as Nilambur Valley. The bank of river Chaliyar at Nilambur region is also known for natural Gold fields. Explorations done at the valley of the river Chaliyar in Nilambur has shown reserves of the order of 2.5 million cubic meters of placers with 0.1 gram per cubic meter of gold. The hilly forested area of Nilambur Taluk forms a portion of the Nilgiri Biosphere Reserve of rich biodiversity.

The  m high Mukurthi peak, which is situated in the border of Nilambur Taluk and  Ooty Taluk, and is also the fifth-highest peak in South India as well as the third-highest in Kerala after Anamudi and Meesapulimala, is the highest point of elevation in Malappuram district. It is also the highest peak in Kerala outside the Idukki district. The Nilambur Taluk has several small and medium-sized tributaries of Chaliyar river.

History 

The teaks for the construction of Uru, a kind of ships those were used for maritime trade through Beypore port, were usually taken from Nilambur Teak Forests. The oldest teak plantation of the world in the Conolly's plot is just  from the town. It was named in memory of Henry Valentine Conolly, the then Malabar district collector. Teak Museum at Nilambur is maintained by the Kerala Forest Research Institute which was established for the memory of the oldest known Teak plantation in the world. The town is also famous for Nilambur Kovilakam, where the Nilambur Rajas resided and ruled the land. Nilambur Rajas were vassals to the Zamorins of Calicut, based at Nilambur.

The Nilambur–Shoranur line is among the shortest as well as picturesque broad gauge railway lines in India. It was laid by the British in colonial era for the transportation of Nilambur Teak logs into United Kingdom through Kozhikode. During British rule, Nilambur's chief importance laid in producing teaks. In the old administrative records of the Madras Presidency, it is recorded that the most remarkable plantation owned by Government in the erstwhile Madras Presidency was the Teak plantation at Nilambur planted in 1844.

Nilambur Teak is the first forest produce to get its own GI tag.

Civic administration 
{ "type": "ExternalData",  "service": "geoshape",  "ids": "Q16135735"}

Nilambur Municipality Election 2020

Connectivity 

Nilambur is well connected to other parts of the Kerala and other parts of the country by road and rail networks. Kozhikode-Nilambur-Gudalur (SH 28) road which is a major interstate highway runs through the heart of Nilambur. Other State highways such as SH 39 (Perumbilavu - Nilambur Road) and SH 73 (Valanchery - Nilambur Road) also serves this town. Construction for Hill Highway is ongoing here. There are also wide and good quality direct road towards Kakkadampoyil of Kozhikode district from here. There is a large fleet of government and private buses and other transports serving this town. There is a KSRTC sub depot which serves the area operating both interstate and intrastate Public bus transport. This town is also served by a railway station called Nilambur road which is the terminus of Nilambur–Shoranur railway line. This railway station connects this town to other parts of India as it has regular trains which leads to shoranur junction which is the largest railway station of Kerala state.

The Nilambur–Nanjangud line is a proposed railway line, which connects Nilambur with the districts of Wayanad, Nilgiris, and Mysore.

The nearest International Airport is Calicut International Airport at Karipur which is 44.50 km from Nilambur.

Places of Interest 

 Nilambur Teak Museum
 Conolly's Plot
 Bungalow Hill
 Nilambur Kovilakam 
 Adyanpara Falls 
 Karimpuzha Wildlife Sanctuary
 New Amarambalam Reserved Forest
 Mukurthi peak
 Fablines
 Vavul Mala
 Anginda peak
 Munderi Seed farm
 Nedumkayam Rain Forests
 Silent Valley National Park
 Chaliyar Mukku

Teak Museum

The oldest Teak plantation of the world is at Conolly's plot.

Nilambur-Shoranur Railway line

The Nilambur–Shoranur line is among the shortest as well as picturesque broad gauge railway lines in India. The railway line is surrounded by teak trees. It was laid by the British in colonial era for the transportation of Nilambur Teak logs into United Kingdom through Kozhikode.

Silent Valley National Park

Silent Valley National Park is located near Karuvarakundu in Nilambur Taluk. It is located in the rich biodiversity of Nilgiri Biosphere Reserve. Karimpuzha Wildlife Sanctuary, New Amarambalam Reserved Forest, and Nedumkayam Rainforest in Nilambur Taluk of Malappuram district, Attappadi Reserved Forest in Mannarkkad Taluk of Palakkad district, and Mukurthi National Park of Nilgiris district, are located around Silent Valley National Park. Mukurthi peak, the fifth-highest peak in South India, and Anginda peak are also located in its vicinity. Bhavani River, a tributary of Kaveri River, and Kunthipuzha River, a tributary of Bharathappuzha river, originate in the vicinity of Silent Valley. The Kadalundi River has also its origin in Silent Valley. The waterfalls like Keralamkundu are also located in Karuvarakundu.

Nadukani Churam
A Ghat road which connects Nilambur with Gudalur and Ooty of neighbouring Nilgiris district. It is located at Vazhikkadavu in the eastern end of Nilambur Taluk and Malappuram district.

Vavul Mala

Several waterfalls and hillstations are located in the Gram panchayats around Vavul Mala (Urangattiri, Edavanna etc.).

Notable people
 P. V. Abdul Wahab, member of Rajya Sabha.
 Aryadan Muhammed, former minister of Kerala.
 Aryadan Shoukath, film director.
 Asif Saheer, footballer.
 Gopinath Muthukad, Magician and motivational speaker.
 Krishnachandran, actor.
 M. Swaraj, politician and Former MLA from Thrippunithura Constituency.
 Nilambur Ayisha, actress.
 Nilambur Balan, actor.
 KM Asif, cricketer.
 Krishnachandran, Actor, playback singer, and dubbing artist.

 Rashin Rahman, actor.
 Sankaran Embranthiri.
 Zeenath, actress.

Nilambur Taluk

Nilambur Taluk, also known as Eastern Eranad Taluk, comes under Perinthalmanna revenue division in Malappuram district of Kerala, India. Its headquarters is the town of Nilambur. Nilambur Taluk contains Nilambur Municipality and a few Gram panchayats. Most of the administrative offices are located in the Mini-Civil Station at Nilambur. The position of Nilambur Taluk in Malappuram district is shown below:

Nilambur Taluk is the largest Taluk in Kerala. It is composed of 21 villages. Since most of Nilambur is the jungle and hilly area, this Taluk has the least population density in the district. Several tributaries of Chaliyar River flow through Nilambur Taluk. Nilambur, Wandoor, Edakkara, Mambad, Kalikavu, and Karuvarakundu, are some major towns in Nilambur Taluk. Nilambur Taluk is bounded by Silent Valley National Park to south, Nilgiri mountain ranges and Pandalur, Gudalur, Ooty, and Kundah Taluks of Nilgiris district to east, Wayanad district and Thamarassery Taluk of Kozhikode district to north, and Eranad and Perinthalmanna Taluks to west. The villages included in the Taluk are:
 Vazhikkadavu
 Nilambur
 Kattumunda
 Edakkara
 Pullipadam
 Karulai
 Chungathara
 Thiruvali
 Karuvarakundu
 Amarambalam
 Mampad
 Kurumbalangode
 Akampadam
 Tuvvur
 Porur
 Vellayur
 Kalikavu
 Kerala Estate
 Pothukal
 Moothedam
 Wandoor
 Chokkad

See also
 Nilambur (State Assembly constituency)
 Nilambur-Shoranur railway line
 Nilambur railway station
 Nilambur–Nanjangud line
 Teak Museum
 Nilambur Kingdom
 List of villages in Malappuram district
 List of Gram Panchayats in Malappuram district
 List of desoms in Malappuram district (1981)
 Revenue Divisions of Kerala

References

External links 

 
 Kerala panchayat election 2020

Cities and towns in Malappuram district
Populated waterside places in India